Protistology is a scientific discipline devoted to the study of protists, a highly diverse group of eukaryotic organisms. All eukaryotes apart from animals, plants and fungi are considered protists. Its field of study therefore overlaps with the more traditional disciplines of phycology, mycology, and protozoology, just as protists embrace mostly unicellular organisms described as algae, some organisms regarded previously as primitive fungi, and protozoa ("animal" motile protists lacking chloroplasts).

They are a paraphyletic group with very diverse morphologies and lifestyles. Their sizes range from unicellular picoeukaryotes only a few micrometres in diameter to multicellular marine algae several metres long.

History
The term "protozoology" has become dated as understanding of the evolutionary relationships of the eukaryotes has improved, and is frequently replaced by the term "protistology". For example, the Society of Protozoologists, founded in 1947, was renamed International Society of Protistologists in 2005. However, the older term is retained in some cases (e.g., the Polish journal Acta Protozoologica).

Journals and societies
Dedicated academic journals include:

 Archiv für Protistenkunde, 1902-1998, Germany (renamed Protist, 1998-); 
 Archives de la Societe Russe de Protistologie, 1922-1928, Russia;
 Journal of Protozoology, 1954-1993, USA (renamed Journal of Eukaryotic Microbiology, 1993-); 
 Acta Protozoologica, 1963-, Poland;
 Protistologica, 1968-1987, France (renamed European Journal of Protistology, 1987-); 
 Japanese Journal of Protozoology, 1968-2017, Japan (renamed Journal of Protistology, 2018-); 
 Protistology, 1999-, Russia.

Other less specialized journals, important to protistology before the appearance of the more specialized:
 Comptes rendus de l'Académie des sciences, 1666-, France;
 Quarterly Journal of Microscopical Science, 1853-1966, UK (renamed Journal of Cell Science, 1966-);
 Archiv für mikroskopische Anatomie, 1865-1923, Germany;
 Transactions of the Microscopical Society, 1841-1869, UK (renamed Journal of Microscopy, 1869-);
 Transactions of the American Microscopical Society, 1880-1994, USA (renamed Invertebrate Biology, 1995-);
 Memórias do Instituto Oswaldo Cruz, 1909-, Brazil.

Some societies:
 Society of Protozoloogists, 1947-2005, USA (renamed International Society of Protistologists, 2005-), with many affiliates;
 International Society for Evolutionary Protistology, 1975, USA.
 Protistology UK (previously British Society for Protist Biology)
 International Society of Protistologists (previously the Society of Protozoologists)

Notable protistologists (sorted by alphabetical order of surnames) 
The field of protistology was idealized by Haeckel, but its widespread recognition is more recent. In fact, many of the researchers cited below considered themselves as protozoologists, phycologists, mycologists, microbiologists, microscopists, parasitologists, limnologists, biologists, naturalists, zoologists, botanists, etc., but made significant contributions to the field.

References

External links

Portal to protistology by the International Society of Protistologists

.
.
Branches of biology